Johann Gotthelf Greiner (February 22. 1732 – August 12. 1797) was a German glassmaker. He is acknowledge as co-inventor of the porcelain.

Biography
Greiner was born in an old-established glassmaker’s family in Scheibe-Alsbach, Thuringia.
He was a descendant of the as Schwabenhans  well known Hans Greiner.

Lifework
Gotthelf Greiner invented together with his cousin and brother-in-law, Gottfried Greiner, independently to Johann Friedrich Böttger, over many years of research work, and in a little bit different chemical composition Porcelain.

His entrepreneurship provided the basics to the Turingian porcelain manufacturing. Greiner’s work and these of his sons was connected with the following foundation of porcelain manufactures:

 1751 Porcelain manufacture in Limbach
 1760 Porcelain manufacturing cloister Veilsdorf in Veilsdorf
 1764 Wallendorf porcelain in Lichte (Wallendorf) 
 1777 Graf von Henneberg porcelain in Ilmenau
 1779 Porcelain manufacturing in Großbreitenbach

Sources 
 
 Gerhard Greiner: Der Schwabe Hans Greiner 1465–1532 - 4. und erweiterte Auflage - Mai 1995 (Familiengeschichte der Thüringer Greiner als genealogische Stammfolge über XI / XII Generationen
 Rudi Greiner-Adam: Der Schwabenhans und seine Nachkommen – Die Gründer von Lauscha und Limbach - 2. ergänzte Auflage 2003

External links

 

1732 births
1797 deaths
Businesspeople from Thuringia
German potters
Lichte
18th-century German inventors
People from Sonneberg (district)